Streptococcus pyogenes is a species of Gram-positive, aerotolerant bacteria in the genus Streptococcus.  These bacteria are extracellular, and made up of non-motile and non-sporing cocci (round cells) that tend to link in chains. They are clinically important for humans, as they are an infrequent, but usually pathogenic, part of the skin microbiota that can cause Group A streptococcal infection.  S. pyogenes  is the predominant species harboring the Lancefield group A antigen, and is often called group A Streptococcus (GAS).  However, both Streptococcus dysgalactiae and the Streptococcus anginosus group can possess group A antigen as well.  Group A streptococci, when grown on blood agar, typically produce small (2–3 mm) zones of beta-hemolysis, a complete destruction of red blood cells. The name group A (beta-hemolytic) Streptococcus (GABHS) is thus also used.

The species name is derived from Greek words meaning 'a chain' of berries ( [Latinized from ]) and pus-forming (genes), since a number of infections caused by the bacterium produce pus.  The main criterion for differentiation between Staphylococcus spp. and Streptococcus spp. is the catalase test.  Staphylococci are catalase positive whereas streptococci are catalase-negative.  S. pyogenes can be cultured on fresh blood agar plates. The PYR test allows for the differentiation of Streptococcus pyogenes other morphologically similar beta hemolytic streptococci ( such as S. dysgalactiae subsp. esquismilis) as S. pyogenes will produce a positive test result. Under ideal conditions, it has an incubation period of 1 to 3 days.

An estimated 700 million GAS infections occur worldwide each year. While the overall mortality rate for these infections is less than 0.1%, over 650,000 of the cases are severe and invasive, with these cases having a mortality rate of 25%. Early recognition and treatment are critical; diagnostic failure can result in sepsis and death.

Epidemiology

S. pyogenes typically colonizes the throat, genital mucosa, rectum, and skin. Of healthy individuals, 1% to 5% have throat, vaginal, or rectal carriage. In healthy children, such carriage rate varies from 2 to 17%. There are four methods for the transmission of this bacterium: inhalation of respiratory droplets, skin contact, contact with objects, surface, or dust that is contaminated with bacteria or, less commonly, transmission through food. Such bacteria can cause a variety of diseases such as streptococcal pharyngitis, rheumatic fever, rheumatic heart disease, and scarlet fever. Although pharyngitis is mostly viral in origin, about 15 to 30% of all pharyngitis cases in children are caused by GAS; meanwhile, 5 to 20% of pharyngitis in adults are streptococcal. The number of pharyngitis cases is higher in children than in adults due to exposures in schools, nurseries, and as a consequence of lower host immunity. Cases of Streptococcal pharyngitis occur more frequently in later winter to early spring in seasonal countries due to many people rebreathing the same indoor air. Disease cases are the lowest during autumn.

The MT1 (metabolic type 1) clone is frequently associated with invasive Streptococcus pyogenes infections among developed countries. The incidence and mortality of S. pyogenes was high during the pre-penicillin era, but had already started to fall prior to the widespread availability of penicillin. Therefore, environmental factors do play a role in the S. pyogenes infection. Incidence of S. pyogenes is 2 to 4 per 100,000 population in developed countries and 12 to 83 per 100,000 population in developing countries. S. pyogenes infection is more frequently found in men than women, with highest rates in the elderly, followed by infants. In people with risk factors such as heart disease, diabetes, malignancy, blunt trauma, surgical incision, virus respiratory infection, including influenza, S. pyogenes infection happens in 17 to 25% of all cases. GAS secondary infection usually happens within one week of the diagnosis of influenza infection. In 14 to 16% of childhood S. pyogenes infections, there is a prior chickenpox infection. Such S. pyogenes infection in children usually manifests as severe soft tissue infection with onset 4 to 12 days from the chickenpox diagnosis. There is also 40 to 60 times increase in risk of S. pyogenes infection within the first two weeks of chickenpox infection in children. However, 20 to 30% of S. pyogenes infection does occur in adults with no identifiable risk factors. The incidence is higher in children (50 to 80% of S. pyogenes infection) with no known risk factors. The rates of scarlet fever in UK was usually 4 in 100,000 population, however, in 2014, the rates had risen to 49 per 100,000 population. Rheumatic fever and rheumatic heart disease (RHD) usually occurs at 2 to 3 weeks after the throat infection, which is more common among the impoverished people in developing countries. From 1967 to 1996, the global mean incidence of rheumatic fever and RHD was 19 per 100,000 with the highest incidence at 51 per 100,000.

Maternal S. pyogenes infection usually happens in late pregnancy; at more than 30 weeks of gestation to four weeks postpartum, which accounts for 2 to 4% of all the S. pyogenes infections. This represents 20 to 100 times increase in risk for S. pyogenes infections. Clinical manifestations are: pneumonia, septic arthritis, necrotizing fasciitis, and genital tract sepsis. According to a study done by Queen Charlotte's hospital in London during the 1930s, the vagina was not the common source of such infection. On the contrary, maternal throat infection and close contacts with carriers were the more common sites for maternal S. pyogenes infection.

Bacteriology

Serotyping 

In 1928, Rebecca Lancefield published a method for serotyping S. pyogenes based on its cell-wall polysaccharide, a virulence factor displayed on its surface. Later, in 1946, Lancefield described the serologic classification of S. pyogenes isolates based on their surface T-antigen.  Four of the 20 T-antigens have been revealed to be pili, which are used by bacteria to attach to host cells. As of 2016, a total of 120 M proteins are identified. These M proteins are encoded by 234 types emm gene with greater than 1,200 alleles.

Lysogeny 

All strains of S. pyogenes are polylysogenized, in that they carry one or more bacteriophage on their genomes. Some of the 'phages may be defective, but in some cases active 'phage may compensate for defects in others. In general, the genome of S. pyogenes strains isolated during disease are >90% identical, they differ by the 'phage they carry.

Virulence factors 

S. pyogenes has several virulence factors that enable it to attach to host tissues, evade the immune response, and spread by penetrating host tissue layers.  A carbohydrate-based bacterial capsule composed of hyaluronic acid surrounds the bacterium, protecting it from phagocytosis by neutrophils. In addition, the capsule and several factors embedded in the cell wall, including M protein, lipoteichoic acid, and protein F (SfbI) facilitate attachment to various host cells.  M protein also inhibits opsonization by the alternative complement pathway by binding to host complement regulators.  The M protein found on some serotypes is also able to prevent opsonization by binding to fibrinogen.  However, the M protein is also the weakest point in this pathogen's defense, as antibodies produced by the immune system against M protein target the bacteria for engulfment by phagocytes.  M proteins are unique to each strain, and identification can be used clinically to confirm the strain causing an infection.

Genome 
The genomes of different strains were sequenced (genome size is 1.8–1.9 Mbp) encoding about 1700-1900 proteins (1700 in strain NZ131, 1865 in strain MGAS5005). Complete genome sequences of the type strain of S. pyogenes (NCTC 8198T = CCUG 4207T) are available in DNA Data Bank of Japan, European Nucleotide Archive, and GenBank under the accession numbers LN831034 and CP028841.

Biofilm formation 
Biofilms are a way for S. pyogenes, as well as other bacterial cells, to communicate with each other. In the biofilm gene expression for multiple purposes (such as defending against the host immune system) is controlled via quorum sensing.
One of the biofilm forming pathways in GAS is the Rgg2/3 pathway. It regulates SHP's (short hydrophobic peptides) that are quorum sensing pheromones a.k.a. autoinducers. The SHP's are translated to an immature form of the pheromone and must undergo processing, first by a metalloprotease enzyme inside the cell and then in the extracellular space, to reach their mature active form. The mode of transportation out of the cell and the extracellular processing factor(s) are still unknown. The mature SHP pheromone can then be taken into nearby cells and the cell it originated from via a transmembrane protein, oligopeptide permease.
In the cytosol the pheromones have two functions in the Rgg2/3 pathway. Firstly, they inhibit the activity of Rgg3 which is a transcriptional regulator repressing SHP production. Secondly, they bind another transcriptional regulator, Rgg2, that increases the production of SHP's, having an antagonistic effect to Rgg3. SHP's activating their own transcriptional activator creates a positive feedback loop, which is common for the production for quorum sensing peptides. It enables the rapid production of the pheromones in large quantities. The production of SHP's increases biofilm biogenesis.
It has been suggested that GAS switches between biofilm formation and degradation by utilizing pathways with opposing effects. Whilst Rgg2/3 pathway increases biofilm, the RopB pathway disrupts it. RopB is another Rgg-like protein (Rgg1) that directly activates SpeB (Streptococcal pyrogenic exotoxin B), a cysteine protease that acts as a virulence factor. In the absence of this pathway, biofilm formation is enhanced, possibly due to the lack of the protease degrading pheromones or other Rgg2/3 pathway counteracting effects.

Disease 

S. pyogenes is the cause of many human diseases, ranging from mild superficial skin infections to life-threatening systemic diseases. Infections typically begin in the throat or skin. The most striking sign is a strawberry-like rash. Examples of mild S. pyogenes infections include pharyngitis (strep throat) and localized skin infection (impetigo).  Erysipelas and cellulitis are characterized by multiplication and lateral spread of S. pyogenes in deep layers of the skin. S. pyogenes invasion and multiplication in the fascia can lead to necrotizing fasciitis, a life-threatening condition which requires prompt surgical intervention to reduce morbidity and mortality. The bacterium is found in neonatal infections.

Infections due to certain strains of S. pyogenes can be associated with the release of bacterial toxins. Throat infections associated with release of certain toxins lead to scarlet fever.  Other toxigenic S. pyogenes infections may lead to streptococcal toxic shock syndrome, which can be life-threatening.

S. pyogenes can also cause disease in the form of post-infectious "non-pyogenic" (not associated with local bacterial multiplication and pus formation) syndromes. These autoimmune-mediated complications follow a small percentage of infections and include rheumatic fever and acute post-infectious glomerulonephritis. Both conditions appear several weeks following the initial streptococcal infection.  Rheumatic fever is characterized by inflammation of the joints and/or heart following an episode of streptococcal pharyngitis.  Acute glomerulonephritis, inflammation of the renal glomerulus, can follow streptococcal pharyngitis or skin infection.

This bacterium remains acutely sensitive to penicillin. Failure of treatment with penicillin is generally attributed to other local commensal organisms producing β-lactamase, or failure to achieve adequate tissue levels in the pharynx.  Certain strains have developed resistance to macrolides, tetracyclines, and clindamycin.

Vaccine 
There is a polyvalent inactivated vaccine against several types of Streptococcus including S. pyogenes called " vacuna antipiogena polivalente BIOL" it is recommended an administration in a series of 5 weeks. Two weekly applications are made at intervals of 2 to 4 days. The vaccine is produced by the  Instituto Biológico Argentino.

There is another potential vaccine being developed; the vaccine candidate peptide is called StreptInCor.

Applications

Bionanotechnology 
Many S. pyogenes proteins have unique properties, which have been harnessed in recent years to produce a highly specific "superglue" and a route to enhance the effectiveness of antibody therapy.

Genome editing 
The CRISPR system from this organism that is used to recognize and destroy DNA from invading viruses, thus stopping the infection, was appropriated in 2012 for use as a genome-editing tool that could potentially alter any piece of DNA and later RNA.

See also 
 Friedrich Fehleisen
 Friedrich Julius Rosenbach
 Friedrich Loeffler
 Frederick Twort

References

Further reading 

 
 
 
 
 
  (corresponding summary article)

External links
 Type strain of Streptococcus pyogenes at BacDive -  the Bacterial Diversity Metadatabase
 Nature-Inspired CRISPR Enzyme Discoveries Vastly Expand Genome Editing . On: SciTechDaily. June 16, 2020. Source: Media Lab, Massachusetts Institute of Technology.

Streptococcaceae
Gram-positive bacteria
Pathogenic bacteria
Scarlet fever
Tonsil disorders
Bacteria described in 1884